Common Reaction is the debut album from Uh Huh Her, which was released on August 19, 2008, in the United States. This is an elextro/pop album that features Camila Grey's voice and Leisha Hailey's abilities on guitar and keyboard.

The track "Explode" was used as a soundtrack in the series The L Word, in the third episode of the fifth season "Lady Of The Lake". The appearance of the song is a tribute to Leisha Hailey, who plays Alice Pieszecki in the show. The track "Dreamer" was used in the 15th episode of the eighth season of Smallville.

Track listing

"Not a Love Song" – 3:33
"Explode" – 2:50
"Wait Another Day" – 4:01
"Common Reaction" - 4:01
"Say So" – 3:29
"Covered" – 3:54
"Everyone" - 3:37
"Away From Here" – 3:22
"So Long" – 2:42
"Dance With Me" – 3:02
"Dreamer" - 3:53

Bonus track
 "Not a Love Song" (Morgan Page Remix) - 7:13
 "Mystery Lights" - 4:15

Music videos
 "Not a Love Song" (2008)
 "Explode" (2008)

Charts

Personnel 
Al Clay – percussion, producer, engineer, mixing, programmed percussion
Camila Grey – synthesizer, bass, guitar, arranger, keyboards, vocals, producer, programmed percussion
Leisha Hailey – synthesizer, vocals, bass, guitar
Jordan Medina – drums 
Brad Ackley- guitars, bass

References

2008 debut albums
Uh Huh Her (band) albums
Nettwerk Records albums